The calle de Serrano, or simply Serrano, is a street in Madrid, Spain. It is noted as location for luxury flagship stores.

The urbanisation took off in 1863, with the construction of the first housing in the street. Initially known as Bulevar Narváez (Narváez Boulevard), the street received its current name following the 1868 Glorious Revolution, during which the namesake, the General Serrano (who had lived in the street), took a leading role. In the 2010s the street became one the favourite grounds for real estate operations of Venezuelan fortunes.

The street starts at the Puerta de Alcalá. Going north across the well-off Salamanca District, historically linked to the upper class and to the presence of luxury stores, Serrano ends at the Plaza de la República del Ecuador, in the junction with the calle del Príncipe de Vergara, in the Chamartín District.

References 
Citations

 Bibliography
 

Chamartín (Madrid)
Salamanca (Madrid)
Streets in Madrid